Hydriomena irata is a species of geometrid moth in the family Geometridae. It is found in North America.

The MONA or Hodges number for Hydriomena irata is 7228.

Subspecies
These three subspecies belong to the species Hydriomena irata:
 Hydriomena irata irata g
 Hydriomena irata lolata McDunnough, 1954 c g
 Hydriomena irata quaesitata Barnes & McDunnough, 1918 c g
Data sources: i = ITIS, c = Catalogue of Life, g = GBIF, b = Bugguide.net

References

Further reading

External links

 

Hydriomena
Moths described in 1910